Frederick Joseph Webster (3 April 1887 – 14 September 1938) was an English professional footballer who played for Crown & Victoria (Sheffield), Gainsborough Trinity, Tottenham Hotspur and Brentford.

Football career 
Webster played for Non league team Crown & Victoria (Sheffield) before joining Gainsborough Trinity in 1907, he played in 89 matches for the club. The full back signed for Tottenham Hotspur in 1911 and made a total of 86 appearances for the Spurs in all competitions. After leaving White Hart Lane, Webster went on to play for Brentford and finally returned to Gainsborough Trinity where he ended his senior career.

References 

1887 births
1938 deaths
Footballers from Sheffield
English footballers
English Football League players
Gainsborough Trinity F.C. players
Tottenham Hotspur F.C. players
Brentford F.C. players
Association football fullbacks